Oxidized low-density lipoprotein receptor 1 (Ox-LDL receptor 1) also known as lectin-type oxidized LDL receptor 1 (LOX-1) is a protein that in humans is encoded by the OLR1 gene.

LOX-1 is the main receptor for oxidized LDL on endothelial cells, macrophages, smooth muscle cells, and other cell types. But minimally oxidized LDL is more readily recognized by the TLR4 receptor, and highly oxidized LDL is more readily recognized by the CD36 receptor.

Function 
LOX-1 is a receptor protein which belongs to the C-type lectin superfamily. Its gene is regulated through the cyclic AMP signaling pathway. The protein binds, internalizes and degrades oxidized low-density lipoprotein.

Normally, LOX-1 expression on endothelial cells is low, but tumor necrosis factor alpha, oxidized LDL, blood vessel shear stress, and other atherosclerotic stimuli substantially increase LOX-1 expression.

LOX-1 may be involved in the regulation of Fas-induced apoptosis.  Oxidized LDL induces endothelial cell apoptosis through LOX-1 binding. Other ligands for LOX-1 include oxidized high-density lipoprotein, advanced glycation end-products, platelets, and apoptotic cells.
The binding of platelets to LOX-1 causes a release of vasoconstrictive endothelin, which induces endothelial dysfunction.

This protein may play a role as a scavenger receptor.

Clinical significance 
Binding of oxidized LDL to LOX-1 activates NF-κB, leading to monocyte adhesion to enthothelial cells (a pre-requisite for the macrophage foam cell formation of atherosclerosis). Macrophage affinity for unmodified LDL particles is low, but is greatly increased when the LDL particles are oxidized. LDL oxidation occurs in the sub-endothelial space, rather than in the circulation. But oxidized cholesterol from foods cooked at high temperature can also be a source of oxysterols.

Mutations of the OLR1 gene have been associated with atherosclerosis, risk of myocardial infarction, and may modify the risk of Alzheimer's disease. When applied to human macrophage-derived foam cells in vitro, the dietary supplement berberine inhibits the expression of the ORL1 gene in response to oxidized low-density lipoprotein cholesterol, but this has not yet been demonstrated in a living animal or human.

References

Further reading

 
 
 
 
 
 
 
 
 
 
 
 
 
 
 
 
 
 
 

C-type lectins
Heart diseases